Fortress Europe was a military propaganda term used by both sides of the Second World War which referred to the areas of Continental Europe occupied by Nazi Germany, as opposed to the United Kingdom across the Channel.

World War II defenses

In British phraseology, Fortress Europe meant the battle honour accorded to Royal Air Force and Allied squadrons during the war, but to qualify, operations had to be made by aircraft based in Britain against targets in Germany, Italy and other parts of German-occupied Europe, in the period from the fall of France to the Normandy invasion.

Simultaneously, the term Festung Europa was being used by Nazi propaganda, namely to refer to Hitler's and the Wehrmacht's plans to fortify the whole of occupied Europe, in order to prevent invasion from the British Isles' troops. These measures included the construction of the Atlantic wall, along with reorganization of the Luftwaffe for air defense. This use of the term Fortress Europe was subsequently adopted by correspondents and historians in the English language to describe the military efforts of the Axis powers at defending the continent from the Allies.

Postwar usage

Currently, within Europe, the term is used either to describe dumping effect of external borders in commercial matters, or as a pejorative description of the state of immigration into the European Union. This can be in reference either to attitudes toward immigration, to border fortification policies pursued for instance in the Spanish North African enclaves of Ceuta and Melilla or to the system of border patrols and detention centers that are used to help prevent asylum seekers and other migrants from entering the European Union.

For right-wing and nationalist parties such as the Freedom Party of Austria, 'Fortress Europe' is a positive term. They mostly claim that such a fortress does not really exist yet, and that immigrants can enter Europe far too easily. They often charge the southern states with insufficient border control, claiming that the latter are acting on the knowledge that immigrants tend to be more attracted to western/northern states with more generous welfare systems such as Switzerland, Germany, Austria, and Sweden.

Controlled external borders
Ceuta and Melilla (Spain) (from Morocco)
Italian and Maltese coast (from Libya and Tunisia)
Canary Islands (Spain) (from Morocco, Western Sahara and Mauritania)
Maritsa (Turkey) (from Near East)
Eastern border of the European Union (from Ukraine, Belarus, Moldova, Russia)
South-Eastern border of the European Union (from Bosnia and Herzegovina, Serbia, Montenegro, Albania, North Macedonia)
Strait of Gibraltar (from Morocco)
South Aegean and North Aegean (from Near East)

See also
Hindenburg Line, German defences on the Western Front of World War I
Siegfried Line, German defences against France in World War II
Maginot Line, French defenses against Germany constructed for World War II
Salpa Line, The last fortified defence line of Finland against the Soviet Union in World War II
Iron Curtain, dividing line through Europe during the Cold War

References

Operation Overlord
World War II defensive lines
Historic defensive lines
World War II propaganda
Illegal immigration to Europe
Axis powers